Brezna may refer to:

Czech Republic 
 Březná, a river

Serbia 
 Brezna, Priboj
 Brezna, Kraljevo
 Brezna, Gornji Milanovac

See also
Brezno (disambiguation)
Berezne